In the Book of Mormon, many wars are listed.  The implications of tribal warfare are there from the beginning until about the time of the "Words of Mormon" where a transition to large armies appears to take place.

Practices 
The Nephites had no compunction about using stratagem if it meant sparing bloodshed. The Lamanites seemed to be a group of kingdoms with a high king in command. There is an implication that each kingdom had its own army and there was a form of plundering among the kingdoms. The mentioning of scaling is notable. And the practice of throwing the enemies' dead into the river is mentioned. Numbers are rarely given.

Wars mentioned in the Book of Mormon 
Implied wars in the time of Jacob.
Wars in the time of Enos.
Many battles in the time of Jarom.
Omni mentions warfare in his time.
In the time of Amaron, there was destruction and in Abinadom's time.
The wars and contentions mentioned by the people of Zarahemla that were had amongst themselves.
War in King Benjamin.
Zeniff's battle with his own comrades.
Zeniff's wars with the Lamanites.
King Noah's battle with the Lamanites
Lamanite invasion at the end of King Noah's reign.
War during Limhi's rule.
War with Amlicites.
Massacres of the Ammonites.
Destruction of Ammonihah and the war that followed.
War with Zerahemnah.
Amalickiah's war against the Nephites.
Battle against Morianton.
Ammoron's war against the Nephites. Coupled with the Kingmen's insurrection and rebellion.
Battles with Lamanites, Moronihah leads the Nephites.
Repealing of Coriantumr's invasion.
Civil wars in the time of Nephi, the son of Helaman.
Wars with Gadianton robbers.
Wars against King Jacob by Nephite tribes.
Wars after the Division of the people. (After the time of Christ.)
War during Mormon's childhood.
Mormon's wars, destruction of the Nephites.
Wars amongst the Lamanites.
Wars amongst the Jaredites.

See also
 Mormonism and violence

Book of Mormon
Wars
Wars in Book of Mormon
Wars
Mormonism and violence